Dibranchus is a fish genus in the family Ogcocephalidae.

Species
There are currently 14 recognized species in this genus:
 Dibranchus accinctus Bradbury, 1999
 Dibranchus atlanticus W. K. H. Peters, 1876 (Atlantic batfish)
 Dibranchus cracens Bradbury, McCosker & Long, 1999
 Dibranchus discors Bradbury, McCosker & Long, 1999
 Dibranchus erinaceus Garman, 1899
 Dibranchus hystrix Garman, 1899
 Dibranchus japonicus Amaoka & Toyoshima, 1981 (Japanese seabat)
 Dibranchus nasutus Alcock, 1891
 Dibranchus nudivomer Garman, 1899
 Dibranchus sparsus Garman, 1899
 Dibranchus spinosus Garman, 1899
 Dibranchus spongiosa C. H. Gilbert, 1890
 Dibranchus tremendus Bradbury, 1999
 Dibranchus velutinus Bradbury, 1999

See also
 List of prehistoric bony fish

References

Ogcocephalidae
Marine fish genera
Taxa named by Wilhelm Peters